Pelutho is a hamlet in the civil parish of Holme St. Cuthbert in Cumbria,  historically in Cumberland, England.

It is situated on the B5301 road between the towns of Aspatria and Silloth.

Etymology
The name "Pelutho" is derived from the Old Norse pil-oat-haugr, meaning "peeled-oats hill". In the past, the name has been written in several different forms, including Pellathow, Pellothoe, Pollathow, Pellithow, and Pelato.

History
During the Roman period, the area around Pelutho was fortified. A series of milefortlets were constructed beyond the western end of Hadrian's Wall to defend against incursions across the Solway Firth. Two of these, milefortlets 13 and 14, are located within  of Pelutho, near the hamlets of Blitterlees and Beckfoot respectively.

Governance
Pelutho is part of the parliamentary constituency of Workington. In the December 2019 general election, the Tory candidate for Workington, Mark Jenkinson, was elected the MP, overturning a 9.4 per cent Labour majority from the 2017 election to eject shadow environment secretary Sue Hayman by a margin of 4,136 votes. Until the December 2019 general election The Labour Party has won the seat in the constituency in every general election since 1979.The Conservative Party has only been elected once in Workington since World War II, at the 1976 by-election.

Before Brexit, it was in the North West England European Parliamentary Constituency.

Travel

References 

Hamlets in Cumbria
Holme St Cuthbert